Big Bend Township is a township in Republic County, Kansas, in the United States. In 2010, it had a population of 177.

History
Big Bend Township was organized in 1872.

References

Townships in Republic County, Kansas
Townships in Kansas